Stanley Tong is a Hong Kong film director, producer, stunt choreographer, screenwriter, entrepreneur and philanthropist.

Early life
Stanley Tong was born on April 7, 1960 in Hong Kong, and he completed his education in Hong Kong and Canada. Tong studied at the University of Manitoba.

Film career
Encouraged by his brother-in-law in Hong Kong, who was a filmmaker, Tong started his film career there in 1979 by working behind the scenes in films.  In 1991, Tong directed his first film, the self-funded Stone Age Warriors (魔域飛龍).  The film received critical acclaim from some famous film critics, which attracted the attention of Golden Harvest.  Tong was then invited to join the company as a film director.

Tong is very well known for his action movies.  Working closely with Jackie Chan, Stanley directed some very popular movies in the 1990s.  Their first collaboration, Police Story 3: Super Cop (警察故事3：超级警察) (1992), broke box office records in many Asian countries and received a nomination for Best Film at the Golden Horse Awards. Tong's other movies with Jackie Chan, such as Rumble in the Bronx (红番区) (1995) and Police Story 4: First Strike (警察故事4：简单任务) (1996), also created significant box office records, the latter grossing HK$57,518,795, the highest box office return for a local film in Hong Kong until 2001.  Also, the release of Rumble in the Bronx in the United States helped Jackie Chan make a name for himself in Hollywood.

Tong customarily attempts stunts himself before asking actors to risk themselves, e.g., Jackie Chan's leap from a parking garage roof to a fire escape in Rumble in the Bronx and the finale of Stone Age Warriors.

During his stay in Hollywood, Tong also filmed his only English language non-martial arts film Mr. Magoo (1997), which was a critical and commercial failure, and Martial Law (1998), which was a moderate critical success.

In 2000, Tong returned to Shanghai, in hopes to inspire the future generation of filmmakers in China.  After his long presence away from home, Tong directed his first film in his homeland, China Strike Force (雷霆战警). In 2005, Tong wrote and directed the film The Myth (神话). In the same year, Tong also helped produce Asia's first computer-animated film, DragonBlade: The Legend of Lang.

In recent years, Tong has produced a number of films, including the films The Myth (2005) and CZ12 (十二生肖) (2012), as well as the TV series Fall in Love with You (偏偏爱上你) (2012) and The Patriot Yue Fei (精忠岳飞) (2013).

Apart from filmmaking, Tong has been active with charity work both in USA and China.  He also works as a guest lecturer in China institutions to help cultivate the nation's future filmmakers.

Filmography
Film

Stone Age Warriors (魔域飛龍) (1991)
Police Story 3: Super Cop (警察故事3 - 超级警察) (1992)
Once a Cop (超级计划) (1993)
Rumble in the Bronx (红番区) (1995)
Police Story 4: First Strike (警察故事4 - 简单任务) (1996)
Mr. Magoo (1997)
China Strike Force (雷霆战警 (2000)
The Myth (神话) (2005)
CZ12 (十二生肖) (2012)
Kung Fu Yoga (2017) starring Jackie Chan
Vanguard (2020)
City Hunter (TBA) starring Huang Xiaoming

Television
Martial Law (1998) (Episodes "Shanghai Express" and "This Shogun for Hire")
Ambition (壮志雄心) (2002) 
Boy & Girl (男才女貌) (2004) 
Water Beauty (出水芙蓉) (2005) 
The Myth (神话) (2010) (credited as creative director)
Fall in Love with You (偏偏爱上你) (2012) 
The Patriot Yue Fei (精忠岳飞) (2013)

Entrepreneurship
In 2001, Tong formed his own production company, China International Media Group Ltd.  Many of his films are partly financed by the company.  In addition, the company has invested in a stunt performers’ training program.  Both local and foreign lecturers who are well known in the industry have been invited to give lessons for the program, and the best students receive opportunities to play in films invested by Tong’s company.

Other work
In 2012, Tong was invited by The 15th Shanghai International Film Festival's SIFFORUM as a guest speaker. At the forum titled "Far East Dream Factory - Future for Chinese Film Industry Upgrading," Tong shared his views with other panelists in the industry.  In 2011, Tong took the role of Honored Consultant for the Film and TV Association of China Public Security Ministry.  The Association is established to produce films and TV series featuring crime stories.
 
In 2008, Tong appeared as a guest judge on the China Beijing TV Station reality television series The Disciple, which aired in Mainland China and was produced by, and features, Jackie Chan. The purpose of the program was to find a new star, skilled in acting and martial arts, to become Chan's "successor", the champion being awarded the lead role in a film.  It concluded on June 7, 2008, with the series winner being announced in Beijing.

Philanthropy
Stanley Tong has organized many charitable activities and has received numerous awards for his contributions to the charity work. Some of them include:
 "Charity Hero" medal for organizing Hong Kong Yan Chai Hospital fundraising activities 
 The President of Fundraising Activities for the Elderly in San Francisco, USA
 The Fundraising Ambassador of the Los Angeles branch of the Eastern China Flood Fundraising Committee
 The Fundraising President of the Hong Kong Disabled Youth Association and the Hong Kong Blind People Association
 Organized fundraising activities for the victims of China's Sichuan earthquake

References

External links
 
 Interview At FarEastFilms.com

Hong Kong film directors
1960 births
Living people
Action choreographers